Seed is Mami Kawada's debut album which was released on March 29, 2006. This album is under Geneon and was produced by I've Sound. This album also includes her first two singles "Radiance / Chi ni Kaeru: On the Earth", and "Hishoku no Sora" and the collaboration single "Face of Fact (Resolution Ver.)" with KOTOKO. It peaked at the #12 spot in the Oricon charts and charted for 5 weeks.

The album will come in a limited CD+DVD edition (GNCA-1080) and a regular CD only edition (GNCA-1081). The DVD will contain the promotional video for SEED.

Track listing
roots—4:13
Composition: Tomoyuki Nakazawa
Arrangement: Tomoyuki Nakazawa, Maiko Iuchi
—4:15
Composition: Tomoyuki Nakazawa
Arrangement: Tomoyuki Nakazawa, Takeshi Ozaki
Lyrics: Mami Kawada
Radiance—4:21
Composition & Arrangement: Tomoyuki Nakazawa
Lyrics: Mami Kawada & KOTOKO
Seed—5:30
Composition: Tomoyuki Nakazawa
Arrangement: Tomoyuki Nakazawa, Takeshi Ozaki
Lyrics: Mami Kawada
Precious - 4:59
Composition: Shinji Orito
Arrangement: Tomoyuki Nakazawa, Takeshi Ozaki
Lyrics: Mami Kawada
—5:45
Composition: Tomoyuki Nakazawa
Arrangement: C.G mix
Lyrics: Mami Kawada
IMMORAL—4:26
Composition & Arrangement: Tomoyuki Nakazawa
Lyrics: KOTOKO
—5:09
Composition & Arrangement: Maiko Iuchi
Lyrics: Mami Kawada
Not Fill—5:09
Composition & Arrangement: Kazuya Takase, Tomoyuki Nakazawa
Lyrics: Mami Kawada
Undelete—5:19
Composition: Tomoyuki Nakazawa
Arrangement: Tomoyuki Nakazawa, Maiko Iuchi
Lyrics: Mami Kawada
You give... -- 5:02
Composition & Arrangement: Maiko Iuchi
Lyrics: Mami Kawada
another planet ～twilight～ -- 4:01
Composition: Tomoyuki Nakazawa
Arrangement: Maiko Iuchi
Lyrics: Mami Kawada

Charts and sales

Mami Kawada albums
2006 albums